Joseph Allan Hulbig (born September 29, 1973, in Norwood, Massachusetts) is an American former professional ice hockey forward. He played left wing. He was selected in the first round of the 1992 NHL Entry Draft, 13th overall, by the Edmonton Oilers.  He went on to play for the Oilers and Boston Bruins of the National Hockey League between 1997 and 2001, as well as four minor league teams in the American Hockey League. He retired in 2004.

Career statistics

Regular season and playoffs

Awards and honors

References

External links 
 

1973 births
Living people
Albany River Rats players
American men's ice hockey forwards
Ice hockey players from Massachusetts
Boston Bruins players
Edmonton Oilers draft picks
Edmonton Oilers players
Hamilton Bulldogs (AHL) players
National Hockey League first-round draft picks
People from Norwood, Massachusetts
Providence Bruins players
Providence Friars men's ice hockey players
Worcester IceCats players